Kului (also known as Kulvi,) is a Western Pahari language spoken in the Indian state of Himachal Pradesh.

Phonology

Consonants 

"a trumpet", which contrasts with  "famine". "grass",  "twenty".

Script 
The native script of the language is a variety of Takri script.

Status 
The language is commonly called Pahari or Himachali. The language has no official status. According to the United Nations Education, Scientific and Cultural Organisation (UNESCO), the language is of definitely endangered category, i.e. many Kulluvi children are not learning Kulluvi as their mother tongue any longer.

Notes

Bibliography

External links 
 Pahari-languages.ru, a Kullui documentation project

Languages of India
Northern Indo-Aryan languages
Endangered languages of India
Languages of Himachal Pradesh